Mepron may refer to:
 Mepron, a brand name of the medication atovaquone
 Mepron (rumen-protected methionine), a trademarked source of methionine used in dairy cattle